STOP THE TRAFFIK was founded in 2006 by Steve Chalke MBE as a campaign coalition which aims to bring an end to human trafficking worldwide. Initially STOP THE TRAFFIK was set up as a two-year campaign to coincide with the bicentenary of the Abolition of the Slave Trade Act 1807. The campaign intended to: 
 Educate: create awareness and understanding of people trafficking
 Advocate: engage with those who have the power to minimise the trafficking of people
 Fundraise: Financing anti-trafficking work around the world working with those vulnerable to and those who have been trafficked

Aims
Developed in close partnership with technology leaders and intelligence specialists, their Centre for Intelligence-Led Prevention collects and analyses data on human trafficking patterns from across the globe. Global campaigns informed by local partnerships feed this intelligence directly into vulnerable communities, enabling resilience building and community transformation. This builds systemic disruption of human trafficking networks. This intelligence informs business and consumer communities about how and where modern slavery is present in global supply chains. This is used to empower consumer communities to change their buying habits and equipping business communities to identify and prevent vulnerability to human trafficking.

Across the UK, it has built Modern Slavery hubs upon a foundation of dedicated volunteers. These hubs empower communities of law enforcement, government agencies, local authorities and NGOs to build resilience through coordination at a strategic and tactical level. Embedded Modern Slavery Coordinators enable resilience building by developing bridges between the hubs and vulnerable local communities. It aims to empower front line professional communities to inform this resilience through commissioned education and awareness raising sessions.

Past projects 
Chocolate campaign

From 2006 to 2010 the organisation ran a campaign which focuses on ending child trafficking into the cocoa industry. Specific emphasis is on the major cocoa growing nations of West Africa, particularly Côte d'Ivoire, which together produces over a third of the world’s cocoa. The campaign has seen some success, with several major chocolate manufacturers agreeing to adopt Fairtrade or Rainforest Alliance cocoa. Some of those who have announced this switch since the campaign began: Mars pledged to make their Galaxy bar Traffik Free by 2010, and their global range by 2020; Dutch manufacturer Verkade committed to 100% fair trade cocoa and sugar in their chocolate bars in the Netherlands from autumn 2008; Swiss Noir committed to fair-trade cocoa in their chocolate bars in the Netherlands from March 2009; Cadbury committed to producing a fair-trade Dairy Milk bar in the UK and Ireland from autumn 2009.

Active Communities against Trafficking (ACT)

STOP THE TRAFFIK are running an ongoing community-based project called ACT which focuses on community mobilisation against human trafficking locally. As STOP THE TRAFFIK state: "Trafficking starts in a community and it can be stopped by the community." The project works by communities forming ACT groups, which seek and share knowledge and understanding of trafficking and how it affects their local community. These groups then use this information to proactively respond in order to stop the traffic.

Start Freedom project

Start Freedom is another project launched in October 2009 and was developed in conjunction with the United Nations and the Serious Organised Crime Agency. It is designed to teach the world about trafficking and consists of educational resources in over 10 languages. Start Freedom lessons have been downloaded in 97 countries. The campaign encourages people to sign up, promote it to their local schools and interact with others. In March 2010 the organisation celebrated Start Freedom Week during which young people shared their freedom adventures with their community through street theatre, film, dance, art, writing and photographs. The world’s first "Global Classroom on Human Trafficking" was hosted and saw 180 young people from across five continents interact with each other and with experts to learn more about human trafficking and what they could do about it in their communities. The goal is to adapt and expand this project to empower young people in vulnerable groups and communities in low income countries through cooperating with NGOs.

Business Travellers Against Trafficking

Business Travellers Against Trafficking aims to inform and educate those who travel internationally to identify and report suspected incidences of trafficking that they see as they travel. The Business Travellers website provides an area in which travellers can report suspicious behavior or activities, can read stories of human trafficking worldwide and can network with one another. In support of this project STOP THE TRAFFIK created and issued Business Traveller wallet cards. These are business card sized and contain the details of major international police agencies as well as details of the Business Travellers URL.

In March 2009 it launched its first book titled STOP THE TRAFFIK: People shouldn't be bought and sold, written by Steve Chalke with a chapter by Cherie Blair. The book covers all of the central issues surrounding human rights and trafficking.

Other activities

It also runs individually designed training programmes designed to be delivered to all manner of professionals and authorities who may come into contact with victims or perpetrators of human trafficking. Training programmes can be adapted to suit the specific needs of individual groups, take into account relevant policy and recent developments, and centre on four key areas: 
 What is human trafficking? 
 What is being done to tackle human trafficking? 
 What are the signs of human trafficking, and how is it reported? 
 What can the community do to tackle human trafficking?

The organisation has launched Freedom Ticket for Life which supports projects in trafficking hot spots. Around the world, girls are less likely to go to school and more likely to be illiterate than their brothers. Less education and training means girls have fewer opportunities to get a job when they are older. This makes girls more vulnerable to being trafficked. The longer a girl is in education the safer she is and the more options she has available about her future afterwards. Currently, the campaign supports projects in Kyrgyzstan, Tanzania and Thailand, and gives the opportunity for Child Sponsorship in Thailand, Philippines, Bangladesh, Uganda and India.

It also headed up a response to the 2012 London Olympic Games. It is their belief that many would be recruited by deception or coercion for exploitation before, during, and after the Games for sexual exploitation, forced labour, and other forms of abuse. In 2011 STOP THE TRAFFIK hosted a global summit which provides a platform for world leaders and professional agencies to work with local communities and young people to tackle human trafficking before, during and after the 2012 Olympics. The summit provided a model that could be replicated in local communities worldwide, linking decision-makers and grassroots activists, creating effective partnerships to prevent human trafficking.

A highlight of the campaign was "Freedom Day" on 25 March 2007, marking the bicentenary of the abolition of transatlantic slavery.  Thousands of people of all ages brought awareness to the streets of their communities all around the world.

The campaign culminated in the delivery of a million and a half petition at the United Nations first ever global forum to combat trafficking. Numerous high profile celebrities as well as over 200 Members of the European Parliament have signed the declaration. With the success of a growing global movement STOP THE TRAFFIK became an independent international charity in 2008 and Steve Chalke, then Chair of STOP THE TRAFFIK, was appointed UN Special Advisor On Community Action Against Trafficking.

In November 2008 it hosted the first ever International People's Lecture on Human Trafficking in London, UK. The event featured speakers including international human rights lawyer Cherie Booth QC, Antonio Maria Costa, Executive Director of United Nations Office on Drugs and Crime (UNODC), and Steve Chalke, founder of STOP THE TRAFFIK.

Awards
STOP THE TRAFFIK won an Advocacy award in the New Statesman New Media Awards.

References

External links
Official website

Charities based in London
Contemporary slavery
International organisations based in London
Organisations based in the London Borough of Lambeth
Organizations that combat human trafficking